In Māori tradition, Moekākara was one of the great ocean-going, voyaging canoes that was used in the migrations that settled New Zealand. It was captained by Tāhuhunui-o-te-rangi, the ancestor of Ngāi Tāhuhu. The canoe first landed at Wakatuwhenua, near Te Arai north of Auckland. Ngāi Tāhuhu settled at Pouerua in the Bay of Islands and the Mangakahia River in Northland, as well as Ōtāhuhu in Auckland.

See also
List of Māori waka

References

Māori waka
Māori mythology